Vanesa Natalia González (born February 3, 1987, in Buenos Aires, Argentina) is an Argentine actress. She portrayed Morena Fontana in the television comedy Son de Fierro.

Early life 
At age 12, González begin to study theater as she continued her school education. Three years later she began theatrical lessons with the former Argentinian actor Lito Cruz.  At  the age of 16 she moved to Capital Federal, Buenos Aires.

Career
González obtained her first role in a television program at the age of 18. She portrayed Eloisa on the teen drama 1/2 Falta.

In 2007, González received a role in the soap opera Son De Fierro playing the part of Morena Fontana.

In 2008, González played Victoria in the comedy Socias.

González also worked on several theater projects such as En el país de Perbrumón (2006) and Así de perras (2007).

González was the actress and co-writer for the musical El burdel de Paris (2008).

Filmography 
Violeta (2011)
Caín and Abel (2010)
Lo que el tiempo nos dejó (2010)
Socias (2008)
Son de Fierro (2007)
Mujeres Asesinas [2006)
1/2 Falta (2005)
Las Estrellas (2017)

External links 
Fan club of Vanesa González.

Argentine actresses
People from Banfield, Buenos Aires
Living people
1987 births